George Henry Decker, Jr. (June 16, 1947 – March 2, 2003) was a Major League Baseball pitcher for the Chicago Cubs (1969–72), Minnesota Twins (1973–76) and Seattle Mariners (1979). He was born in Storm Lake, Iowa.

He was traded along with Bill Hands and minor‐league pitcher Bob Maneely by the Cubs to the Minnesota Twins for Dave LaRoche on December 1, 1972.

In February 2001, Joe Decker from the United States was officially recognized as the most athletic person in the world. In 24 hours, he cycled 161 km, ran 16 km, walked 8 km, kayaked 9.5 km, and swam 3 km himself. He didn't stop there. Joe pumped his abs 3,000 times, jumped out of a squat 1,100 times, did push-ups 1,100 times, did 1,000 leg swings, worked out 16 km on ski and rowing machines and lifted weights for 3 hours-for a total of 126,371 kg.

He died at age 55 from head injuries following a fall at his home in Fraser, Michigan.

References

External links
, or Retrosheet
Venezuelan Winter League

1947 births
2003 deaths
Accidental deaths from falls
Accidental deaths in Michigan
American expatriate baseball players in Mexico
Arizona Instructional League Cubs players
Arizona State Sun Devils baseball players
Baseball players from Iowa
Chicago Cubs players
Diablos Rojos del México players
Evansville Triplets players
Gold Coast Suns (baseball) players
Lodi Crushers players
Major League Baseball pitchers
Mexican League baseball pitchers
Minnesota Twins players
People from Fraser, Michigan
People from Storm Lake, Iowa
Salt Lake City Gulls players
San Antonio Missions players
San Bernardino Pride players
San Jose Missions players
Seattle Mariners players
Sportspeople from Metro Detroit
Tacoma Cubs players
Tecolotes de Nuevo Laredo players
Tigres de Aragua players
American expatriate baseball players in Venezuela
Treasure Valley Cubs players
Wichita Aeros players